The Takasaki Line is a Japanese railway line which connects Ōmiya Station in Saitama, Saitama Prefecture and Takasaki Station in Takasaki, Gunma Prefecture. It is owned and operated by the East Japan Railway Company (JR East).

All services on the line (excluding through Shonan-Shinjuku Line trains) run to/from Ueno Station in Tokyo via the Tōhoku Main Line. The line was extended to Tokyo Station via the Ueno-Tokyo Line that opened in March 2015.

As the Takasaki Line serves many major cities within Saitama Prefecture, it is a vital means of transport within the prefecture. National Route 17 and its historical predecessor, the Nakasendō, run parallel to the line.

Services
Services on the Takasaki Line are typically divided into three categories: services to or from Ueno, Shōnan-Shinjuku Line services, and Ueno-Tokyo Line services. Between Ueno and Ōmiya, trains share the track with the Tōhoku Main Line (Utsunomiya Line), both of which serve as de facto express services compared to the parallel Keihin-Tōhoku Line. Service on the line is provided by 15-car E231 series and E233-3000 series four-door suburban commuter EMUs with two Green cars; north of Kagohara, this is reduced to 10-cars.

Limited express / express
Prior to the opening of the Joetsu Shinkansen in 1982 and the Nagano Shinkansen in 1997, many Niigata- and Nagano-bound limited express and express services used the line, including the Toki, Asama, and Hakutaka. However, the Shinkansen reduced the need for most of these limited express services, and only a few remain. These include:
 Akagi / Swallow Akagi (four Ueno-bound and six Maebashi-bound services daily)
 Kusatsu (three round-trips daily between Ueno and )
 Minakami (between Ueno and )

Local/rapid services

Rapid Urban 
This service stops at every station on the Tokaido Line, and skips some stations on the Takasaki Line.

Local 
Local trains run approximately four times hourly; one or two of those terminates at Kagohara, while the rest terminate at Takasaki, Shin-Maebashi, or Maebashi.

Shōnan-Shinjuku Line services 

Within the Takasaki Line, Shōnan-Shinjuku Line special rapid and rapid trains are each operated once per hour. Unlike regular Ueno bound or originating trains, they bypass Saitama-Shontoshin station as it has no platform for the tracks used by the Shonan-Shinjuku Line. Previously bypassed Urawa station now has a newly constructed platform that entered service in March 2013.

All trains are 10- or 15-car E231 or E233 series EMUs.

Special rapid 
Special rapid trains operate once hourly to Takasaki, making limited stops. They skip Ebisu station.

Rapid 
Rapid trains operate once hourly to Kagohara, stopping at all stations while within the Takasaki line; this increases 2-3 times an hour during the mornings and evenings, when Takasaki-, Odawara-, and Kozu-bound trains also operate. North of Kagohara, all services are operated with 10-car trainsets.

Past services

Commuter rapid 
Commuter rapid services operated on weekday evenings only. They operated between Ueno and Maebashi/Takasaki. This service ended on 12 March 2021.

Limited express 
 Akebono (night train between Ueno and Aomori)
 Hokuriku, Noto (night trains between Ueno and Kanazawa)

Home Liner Kōnosu 
Four trains bound for Kōnosu depart Ueno every weekday evening. Passengers can board only at Ueno; all other stations are for disembarking only. Service is provided by 7-car 185 series and 9-car 489 series EMU trainsets.

Station list 
 Local trains, excluding Shōnan-Shinjuku Line through trains, stop at all stations (except Nippori).
 For limited express, express, and seasonal rapid Moonlight Echigo services, please see their respective articles.

Legends:

 ● : All trains stop
｜: All trains pass
■: Shōnan–Shinjuku Line trains stop, but use dedicated platforms on the Tohoku Freight Line
∥ : Shōnan–Shinjuku Line trains do not travel within this section

Rolling stock
 E231 series EMUs
 E233-3000 series EMUs (since 1 September 2012)

History
The Nippon Railway Co., the first private railway company in Japan, opened the Ueno - Omiya - Shinmachi section in 1883, and extended the line to Takasaki (and Shinmaebashi) the following year. The company was nationalised in 1906. The line was double-tracked between 1927 and 1930, and electrified in 1952.

Former connecting lines

 Honjo Station: The Honjo Electric Railway operated a 7 km line to Kodama, electrified at 600 V DC, between 1915 and 1930.
 Kumagaya Station: The 10 km Tobu Kumagaya Line to Menuma operated from 1943 to 1983. The planned extension to the Tobu Koizumi Line was never constructed.
 Kuragano Station: The Iwahana Light Railway operated a 3 km line to Joshu Iwahana between 1917 and 1945. In 1967, an approximately 1 km siding was built on the alignment to serve an industrial area.

See also
 Utsunomiya Line
 Tohoku Main Line
 Shonan-Shinjuku Line
 Ueno-Tokyo Line

References
This article incorporates material from the corresponding article in the Japanese Wikipedia.

External links

 

 
Lines of East Japan Railway Company
Railway lines in Tokyo
Rail transport in Saitama Prefecture
Rail transport in Gunma Prefecture
Railway lines opened in 1883
1067 mm gauge railways in Japan